The Chembur causeway is a causeway in Bombay, India. It was built about 1846. The causeway is used at all seasons, the chief traffic, besides passengers, being grass, rice, fruit, and vegetables on their way to Bombay. It is repaired as part of the Kurla-Trombay road out of the Thana Local Funds. There is no toll.

References
Causeways from Thana District Gazetteer

Streets in Mumbai